Jason Christopher Marsden (born January 3, 1975) is an American actor, voice actor and filmmaker, who has done numerous voice roles in animated films, as well as various television series and video games. He has been the official voice of Max Goof since 1995.

Early life 
Marsden was born in Providence, Rhode Island, on January 3, 1975, to Linda (née Williams), and Myles Marsden (19362019). Linda was a former fashion model and Myles was a former premier danseur of the Yugoslav National Ballet. He has three older half-siblings from his father's first marriage to dancer Ivanka Herci Munitic: Ana Fox (née Marsden), ballet dancer Richard Anton "Rick" Marsden, and Mark Marsden.

Career 
In 1986, Marsden got his first professional acting job as the character A. J. Quartermaine, in the television series General Hospital. In 1987, at the age of twelve, Marsden booked his first major film role in a science fiction movie called Robot Jox, which was released two years after filming because of the studio's financial problems and inevitable bankruptcy at the time. This was followed soon afterwards by the role of Eddie Munster in the TV series remake of The Munsters titled The Munsters Today. At the same time, he also had his first voice acting role in a cartoon, that of Cavin in the later seasons of the Disney TV series Disney's Adventures of the Gummi Bears, as well as being the young announcer of the (new) Mickey Mouse Club and Disney Infomercials.

Marsden continued his career with many guest star appearances on prime time sitcoms. In 1990, he was the voice of Peter Pan in Peter Pan and the Pirates, which ran for two seasons and in 1992, he landed the role of Dash X in Eerie, Indiana.

He provided the voice of Thackery Binx as a black cat in Disney's Hocus Pocus and reprised the role in the Hocus Pocus Villain Spelltacular.

His next roles included voicing Goofy's son Max Goof in Disney's A Goofy Movie (1995), as well as in the sequel An Extremely Goofy Movie (2000) and also had a supporting role in White Squall (1996). Marsden also did the voice of Garrett Miller on Extreme Ghostbusters and the younger versions of Shere Khan and King Louie on Jungle Cubs, which was a prequel to Disney's hit film Jungle Book and also continued his role as Max Goof on Disney's House of Mouse.

Some other on-camera roles were that of Rich Halke (J.T's best friend) in Step by Step, which was from 1995 until the show's cancellation in 1998; and Nelson Burkhard (D.J.'s rich boyfriend) in Full House, though after making a commitment with Dragon Con, Marsden did not reprise his role as Nelson in the sequel Fuller House instead Hal Sparks (who actually replaced Marsden as Tak in Tak and the Power of Juju series based on the 2003 video game of the same name) took over the role as Nelson. On Boy Meets World the part of "Jason" was written for him by show's creator/producer Michael Jacobs, whom Jason had worked with previously on the short-lived reboot of The Torkelsons called Almost Home. When it was time for Mr. Feeny (Played by William Daniels) to address "Jason" the writers thought it might be funny if he called Jason by his real last name. Jason agreed, and thus Eric Matthews' best friend "Jason Marsden" was played by Jason Marsden, after his departure from Boy Meets World after finishing Season 2, his character was replaced by Jack Hunter (Played by Matthew Lawrence) in Seasons 5-7. He played the young Burt Ward/Robin in the 2002 television movie Return to the Batcave: The Misadventures of Adam and Burt. In 1999, he was featured in Walt Disney Animation Studios' Tarzan as a member of the gorilla family. With thanks to the film's director, Kevin Lima, who also helmed A Goofy Movie.

Since Step by Step, Marsden has provided voices for numerous animated television shows and computer games. He appeared in a direct-to-video film, as the voice of Kovu in The Lion King II: Simba's Pride (1998) and narrated many of the special features on the Lion King Special edition DVD. He was the voice of Haku in the American dub of Spirited Away (2001). He has also provided the voice of Richie Foley/Gear in the television series Static Shock. In Baldur's Gate II: Shadows of Amn, he voiced several characters, most notably Lilarcor the talking sword, and the druid Cernd.

His first foray into directing was an episode of the Nickelodeon series The Journey of Allen Strange (1997). He also directed, wrote, produced and edited The Greatest Short Film Ever!!! and multiple indie music videos.

He has done voice-over work on multiple DC Comics-inspired animated series; as Clark Kent as a teenager in Superman: The Animated Series, as Snapper Carr in Justice League, as Billy Numerous in Teen Titans, as Donny Grasso on an episode of  Batman Beyond, as Danger Duck in Loonatics Unleashed and as the villain Firefly in The Batman and as Paco in Batman: The Brave and the Bold. More recently, he played Impulse and Atom in Young Justice: Invasion. He also voiced Chase Young in Xiaolin Showdown from 2003 to 2006.

He also voiced for Tak in the game Tak and the Power of Juju along with Tak 2: The Staff of Dreams and Tak: The Great Juju Challenge. He voiced two recruitable companion characters in the Fallout game series, Myron in Fallout 2 (1998) and Boone in Fallout: New Vegas (2010).

From late summer 2004 to early spring 2007, Marsden was the head announcer for Toon Disney (excluding Jetix), but he also served as a part-time announcer for Disney Channel. He had a cameo in the film Fun with Dick and Jane as the cashier at the gas station, and was Tasslehoff Burrfoot in the movie Dragonlance: Dragons of Autumn Twilight.

In 2012, Marsden did the voice of Final Fantasy XIII-2 character Noel Kreiss, Kade Burns and Fingers on The Hub series Transformers: Rescue Bots and Kaijudo, and continues to provide the voices of Nermal, Vito, Doctor Bonkers and numerous others on The Garfield Show.

In 2013, he did the voice of Aye-Aye in The Legend of Korra.

In 2014, he voiced Sumo and Belson in the pilot episode of the Cartoon Network animated series Clarence. After this episode, the voices of Sumo and Belson were handed to Tom Kenny and Roger Craig Smith, respectively.

In 2019, Marsden returned to voice Bart Allen / Kid Flash in Young Justice: Outsiders. 

In 2020, Marsden began producing an online web series for YouTube called The Mars Variety Show. Following the style of The Dean Martin Show, it features Indie musicians, comedians, and alternative performers.

Personal life 
Marsden married Christy Hicks in October 2004; however, they divorced in 2020 after sixteen years of marriage. In 2007, Marsden and Christy opened up a Yoga studio in Burbank, California. Their son was born on February 10, 2010. Marsden lives in Nashville, Tennessee.

In 2020, Marsden revealed he has a girlfriend during an interview for a YouTube series.

Filmography

Live-action

Film

Television

Voice roles

Film

Television

Video games

Theme parks

References

External links 

 
 
 
 
 

1975 births
Living people
Actors from Providence, Rhode Island
American film directors
American male child actors
American male film actors
American male soap opera actors
American male television actors
American male video game actors
American male voice actors
American people of English descent
American television directors
Disney people
Male actors from Rhode Island
20th-century American male actors
21st-century American male actors